Jean-Claude Larrieu (born 23 September 1946) is a French former professional footballer who played as goalkeeper.

Larrieu joined the French Olympic Team during the 1976 Summer Olympic Games in Montreal, with Michel Platini and Patrick Battiston, amongst others.

References

1946 births
French footballers
Sportspeople from Bayonne
Ligue 1 players
AS Cannes players
Olympic footballers of France
Footballers at the 1976 Summer Olympics
Living people
French-Basque people
Association football goalkeepers
Aviron Bayonnais FC players
Footballers from Nouvelle-Aquitaine